Loïc Lamouller (born 16 May 1978) is a French former racing cyclist. He rode in the 2001 Tour de France.

Major results
1996
 1st  Road race, National Junior Road Championships
1998
 8th Tro-Bro Léon
1999
 10th Overall Tour du Poitou Charentes
2000
 10th Overall Tour de Langkawi
2003
 9th Tour du Jura
2004
 7th Tour du Jura

References

External links
 

1978 births
Living people
French male cyclists
People from L'Isle-Adam, Val-d'Oise
Sportspeople from Val-d'Oise
Cyclists from Île-de-France